Rusty Young (born 1975) is an Australian-born writer known for his book, Marching Powder published by Pan Macmillan Australia in 2003, and based on real life experiences in a Bolivian prison. Rusty Young is a commerce/law graduate from the University of New South Wales, who has lived most of his life in Sydney, Australia.

Marching Powder 

Rusty Young was backpacking in South America when he heard about Thomas McFadden (in the "Lonely Planet" guidebook and from other backpackers), a convicted English drug trafficker who ran tours inside Bolivia's famous San Pedro Prison. Curious about the reason behind McFadden's huge popularity, the law graduate went to La Paz and joined one of Thomas's illegal tours. They formed an instant friendship and then became partners in an attempt to record Thomas's experiences in the jail. Rusty bribed the guards to allow him to stay and for the next three months he lived inside the prison, sharing a cell with Thomas. After securing Thomas's release, Rusty Young lived in Colombia where he taught the English language and wrote Thomas's story. The memoir, Marching Powder, was released in 2003 and became an international bestseller. In 2015 he returned secretly to the prison to film a segment for Australia's Sunday Night program.

Counter-terrorism work in Colombia 

Following the success of Marching Powder, Rusty was recruited as a Program Director of the US government's Anti-Kidnapping Program in Colombia. He explained in an interview with ABC Radio presenter Richard Fidler that the job was so dangerous he had to keep it secret even from close family members. Instead, he told people he worked as an executive in a corporation in Colombia, but alluded to the hazards of the position in interviews. For instance, the UNSW Law website quoted Rusty as saying: "At times it can be dangerous, so they’ve given me a bullet-proof car. I wake up every morning and know I’m a long way from my days at UNSW." Rusty finally revealed his work in Anti-Kidnapping to the Australian 60 Minutes program in July 2017.

Colombiano 

While living and working in Colombia, Rusty interviewed special forces soldiers, snipers, undercover intelligence agents and members of two terrorist organisations: the FARC and Autodefensas. He was particularly touched by the plight of child soldiers and decided to incorporate their stories into a novel. In January 2016, the rights to Colombiano, Rusty's second book, were sold by literary agent Simone Camilleri to Random House Australia after a competitive bidding war. Colombiano was released in August 2017. and became an immediate bestseller, being the highest selling fiction title by an Australian author in August 2017.

The novel, set in Colombia, is the story of one young man’s descent into war and violence in order to avenge his father's murder. Commercial fiction publisher Beverley Cousins said: "From Rusty’s work with child soldiers in Colombia has grown a story that shocks, thrills and packs a strong emotional punch."

Wildlands documentary 

Rusty also fronts the documentary Wildlands (2017), produced by Ubisoft and Chief Productions, distributed by Journeyman Pictures, in which he interviews notorious characters formerly involved in the cocaine trade including George Jung – famously played by Johnny Depp in the movie Blow – and, more terrifyingly, John Jairo Velasquez or “Popeye”, the right-hand man of Pablo Escobar and one of the deadliest hitmen in cartel history.

List of works 
 Marching Powder: A True Story of Friendship, Cocaine, and South America's Strangest Jail (book)- released 2003
 Marching Powder (film) - announced 
 Colombiano (book) - released August 2017 (Australia), March 2019 (UK), April 2019 (US and Worldwide).
 Wildlands (documentary) - released November 2017

References

External links 

 Marching Powder: A True Story of Friendship, Cocaine, and South America's Strangest Jail (book)- 2003
 MarchingPowder.com - official site of Marching Powder
 ColombianoByRustyYoung.com
 All News - Law Sydney Australia
 
  How to write a best seller: An interview with Rusty Young - Arts Hub
 Colombiano - Random House Australia
 Wildlands - Journeyman Pictures

1975 births
Australian non-fiction writers
Australian travel writers
Living people
Writers from Sydney
People educated at Scots College (Sydney)